Man Bahadur Bishwakarma is a Nepali politician, former cabinet minister and an incumbent member of the House of Representatives of the federal parliament of Nepal. He was elected to parliament in the 2017 legislative election, from Nepali Congress, under the proportional representation system, filling the reserved seat for Dalits.

He is a member of the central working committee of the main opposition party Nepali Congress, having been in the role since at least 2009.

He was the Minister for Environment, Science and Technology in 2007.

References

Living people
Nepal MPs 2017–2022
Nepali Congress politicians from Lumbini Province
Khas people
Members of the 2nd Nepalese Constituent Assembly
Dalit politicians
1948 births